Gust Kundert (December 7, 1913 – March 3, 2000) was an American politician.

From Mound City, South Dakota, Kundert served in the South Dakota House of Representatives from 1983 to 1988 as a Republican. His father Otto Kundert and his sister Alice Kundert also served in the South Dakota House of Representatives.

Notes

1913 births
2000 deaths
People from Campbell County, South Dakota
Republican Party members of the South Dakota House of Representatives
20th-century American politicians